William Jeremiah Murray (April 13, 1864 — March 25, 1937) was one of the most successful managers in American minor league baseball during the late 19th and early 20th centuries. He also spent three seasons (1907–09) in Major League Baseball as manager of the Philadelphia Phillies of the National League.

Biography

A native of Peabody, Massachusetts, Murray began his minor league managing career at age 25 with the Quincy, Illinois, Ravens of the Central Interstate League in 1889. After winning back-to-back pennants at Quincy and Joliet of the Illinois–Iowa League in 1891–92, Murray spent nine seasons (1894–1902) as skipper of the Providence Grays of the top-level Eastern League (a forerunner of today's International League). He then spent four winning seasons as manager of the Jersey City Skeeters of the Eastern circuit, taking one league pennant. His record as a minor league manager was 1,234 victories and 876 defeats over 18 seasons, a winning percentage of .585, one of the highest among longtime minor league managers.

Murray then took the helm of the Phillies in 1907, inheriting a fourth-place team that had won only 71 games during . Murray promptly led the Phils to 83 victories and a third-place finish in 1907, but his club finished  games in arrears of the league champion Chicago Cubs. His  club also won 83 games, but fell to fourth, 16 games behind Chicago. When the 1909 Phillies tumbled even further, to 74 wins and a fifth-place finish,  games behind the Pittsburgh Pirates, Murray was replaced as manager by Red Dooin. His career record as a major-league manager was 240–214 (.529).

He died in Youngstown, Ohio, at the age of 72.

References
Bucek, Jeanine, ed. dir., The Baseball Encyclopedia. New York: Macmillan Books, 1996.
Johnson, Lloyd, ed., The Minor League Register. Durham, North Carolina: Baseball America, 1994.

External links

Retrosheet: managing record
Williams, Phil, Billy Murray. Society for American Baseball Research Biography Project

1864 births
1937 deaths
Atlanta Firecrackers players
Atlanta Windjammers players
Aurora Indians players
Baseball players from Massachusetts
Boston Red Sox scouts
Buffalo Bisons (minor league) players
Joliet Convicts players
Lynn Lions players
Minor league baseball managers
People from Peabody, Massachusetts
Philadelphia Phillies managers
Pittsburgh Pirates scouts
Portsmouth Lillies players
Providence Clamdiggers (baseball) players
Providence Grays (minor league) players
Quincy Black Birds players
Quincy Ravens players
Salem (minor league baseball) players
Sportspeople from Essex County, Massachusetts